Gabor Korvin (born in 1942 in Hungary) is a Hungarian Mathematician. He served as a professor at the Department of Earth Sciences, King Fahd University of Petroleum and Minerals. His main areas of research interest include fractal geometry in the earth sciences, statistical rock physics and mathematical geophysics.
He is a well-known Applied Mathematician, Geophysicist, Petrophysicist, Historian.
At KFUPM he was Coordinator of the Reservoir Characterization Research Group. As Professor, he taught Reservoir Characterization, Seismic Stratigraphy, Petrophysics & Well logging, Solid Earth Geophysics, Geoelectric Exploration, Reflection Seismology, Inverse Problems, Geostatistics and Reservoir Characterization.
Fractal Models in the Earth Sciences by Gabor Korvin was one of the earlier books on the application of Fractals in the Earth Sciences.

Education
 Ph.D. in geophysics, Univ. Heavy Industries, Miskolc, Hungary, 1978
 M.Sc. in Applied Mathematics, Univ. Nat. Sciences, Budapest, Hungary, 1966
 Graduate Diploma in Islamic Studies, Univ. New England, Armidale, Australia, 1998

Employment
 1966–1985, Exploration seismologist and software developer in the Hungarian Geophysical Institute, Budapest
 1986–1991, Senior Lecturer, University of Adelaide, Australia
 1994–2016, Professor of Geophysics, King Fahd University of Petroleum and Minerals (KFUPM), Saudi Arabia.

Books
Korvin, G., "Fractal Models in the Earth Sciences"

References

Hungarian academics
1942 births
Living people